Veitchia subdisticha is a plant species in the palm family. It is found only in Solomon Islands. It is threatened by habitat loss.

References

subdisticha
Trees of the Solomon Islands
Endemic flora of the Solomon Islands
Data deficient plants